The Muskwa Ranges are a group of mountain ranges in northern British Columbia, Canada.  They are part of the Northern Rockies section of the Rocky Mountains and are bounded on their west by the Rocky Mountain Trench and on their east by the Rocky Mountain Foothills.  They are delimited on the north by the Liard River and on the south by the Peace Reach of the Lake Williston reservoir (formerly the Peace River), south of which the next major grouping of the Rockies is the Hart Ranges.

Mountains and peaks
Mount Ulysses- 
Mount Sylvia- 
Mount Lloyd George- 
Great Rock Peak- 
Mount Roosevelt- 
Great Snow Mountain- 
Mount Peck- 
Churchill Peak- 
Yedhe Mountain- 
Gataga Peak-

Sub-ranges
Allied Leaders Range
Akie Range
Battle of Britain Range
Deserters Range
Gataga Ranges
Italy Range
Rabbit Plateau
Sentinel Range
Stone Range
Terminal Range
Tochieka Range
Tower of London Range
Truncate Range

See also
Ranges of the Canadian Rockies

References

Mountain ranges of British Columbia
Ranges of the Canadian Rockies
Northern Interior of British Columbia
Lists of mountain ranges of Canada